The Nord Autobahn (A5) is a motorway, or Autobahn, in Lower Austria and part of European route E461.  The first stage, which opened to traffic 31 January 2010, starts from a junction with the Vienna Outer Ring Expressway (S1) at Großebersdorf and goes through the wine quarter to Schrick, where it becomes the highway B7.

An extension of the A5 from Schrick to Poysbrunn was completed in December 2017. The traffic release took place on 8 December 2017.  At a later stage, it is planned to extend the A5 all the way to the Czech border, where it will continue as the Czech D52, forming a continuous motorway link between Vienna and Brno.

References

External links 
 

Autobahns in Austria